The Madone is a mountain of the Swiss Lepontine Alps, located between the valleys of Maggia and Verzasca in the canton of Ticino.

References

External links
 Madone on Hikr

Mountains of the Alps
Mountains of Switzerland
Mountains of Ticino
Lepontine Alps